Infernal Eternal is the second live album by Swedish black metal band Marduk. It was recorded in France during the World Panzer Battle tour and released on october 31, 2000 by Regain Records.

Track listing

Trivia
 Infernal Eternal is titled after a song of the same name which appeared on Marduk's 1996 album Heaven Shall Burn... When We Are Gathered.

Personnel
Marduk
 Legion – vocals
 Morgan Steinmeyer Håkansson – guitar
 B. War – bass
 Fredrik Andersson – drums

Guests
 David Decobert - live recording
 Joe Petagno - cover art

References

Albums with cover art by Joe Petagno
2000 live albums
Marduk (band) live albums